Etna is a fictional character who appears in the Disgaea series of video games. First appearing as one of the main characters in the series's first entry, Disgaea: Hour of Darkness in 2003, she has appeared in most subsequent entries in either lead or supporting roles, and had many cameo appearances across other Nippon Ichi Software video games.

Concept and creation
Disgaea artist Takehito Harada described her as a "scheming, disrespectful sidekick." He stated, "I represented Etna's personality by the unbalance between her youthful body style and her sexy outfit. The producers told me to create her as a spiteful attendant, and it was pretty easy. Other than her details, the initial design has not changed." NIS America PR and marketing manager Nao Zook felt that Etna and the Prinnies are among the "standouts" of Cross Edge. Zook also cited Etna as among his favourite characters in the crossover game Trinity Universe.

Appearances

Disgaea: Hour of Darkness
Etna first appears in the PlayStation 2 video game Disgaea: Hour of Darkness. Etna is the leader of the Prinny squad, and one of the few vassals who remain in the Overlord's Castle after King Krichevskoy's death. In the beginning, she attempts to wake up Laharl through 'unique' methods (most of which involved guns). From then on, Etna becomes Laharl's closest vassal, though not necessarily most trustworthy vassal, aiding him in his rise to power. She is the only vassal from Laharl's original servants who goes out on the battlefield for him. Etna often acts carefree and tends to be rather snarky towards Laharl and Flonne, but is also very devious and underhanded. Often it is hard to tell for whom she really is working. She holds deep respect and loyalty towards King Krichevskoy, Laharl's father. When it comes to her Prinnies, however, she tends to be rather abusive towards them, especially in later games. Etna is often known for ending an episode with a preview of the next episode, all of which have her in the starring role. Often these previews parody famous TV shows, anime, or video games with the other characters making side comments. These previews tend to be silly and rarely have anything to do with the next episode. In both the Normal and Bad Endings, Laharl gives up his position as Overlord to Etna before either killing himself or running away. In the good ending, she remains as his vassal.

Remakes and "Etna Mode"
The PSP and DS ports of Disgaea feature a new mode called "Etna Mode", where she accidentally kills Laharl in the beginning of the story and then continues her own story, where she disguises a Prinny as Laharl to trick people into thinking that he was still alive. The mode elaborates on her past and her relationship with King Krichevskoy.

Disgaea 2: Cursed Memories
She appears in the sequel Disgaea 2: Cursed Memories, where she quits her position as Laharl's vassal after a fight with him and becomes a Demon Lord with her Prinny Squad. She travels to Veldime, hoping to eliminate Overlord Zenon and runs into Adell and his party in the process. She later gives Adell a fake "Demon Lord's Nail" and is accidentally summoned by his mother. The failed summon greatly weakens her, and in order to regain her former power she deigns to join up with the player's party. She returns to Laharl as his vassal by the end of the game.

Disgaea: Infinite
The game Disgaea Infinite features an ending where Etna (under the influence of the main character Prinny) allows Laharl to steal/take the Super Rare Pudding. He promptly eats it, to which he exclaims that the pudding is extremely delicious. She recovers, and gets into a fight with him about it and quits.

Disgaea 3: Absence of Justice
In Disgaea 3: Absence of Justice, Etna appears alongside Laharl and Flonne and assumes the legendary Overlord they are looking for is the protagonist Mao, who believes that they are the legendary Overlords.

Disgaea 4: Promise Unforgotten
In Disgaea 4: A Promise Unforgotten she appears in the post-game to become president and make the stars her servants.

Disgaea D2: Brighter Darkness
She appears in Disgaea D2: A Brighter Darkness, the fifth game in the series which takes place at least several months before Disgaea 2, where she is once again one of the main playable characters and discovers that she has an older brother named Xenolith, the game's antagonist.

Disgaea 5: Alliance of Vengeance 
Disgaea 5 contains side-story and character downloadable content (DLC) from past entries in the series; Etna appears in the story DLC related to Disgaea: Hour of Darkness and Disgaea D2, and as a playable character.

Prinny spinoff series
Etna appears in the spin-off PSP game Prinny: Can I Really Be the Hero?, where she sends her Prinny Squad to recover her Ultra Dessert and appears as an extra boss later in the game. The sequel Prinny 2: Dawn of Operation Panties, Dood! has her dispatch her Prinny Squad to recover a stolen pair of panties.

Other games
Etna appears in the video games Phantom Brave, Makai Kingdom: Chronicles of the Sacred Tome, Cross Edge and Trinity Universe. A Limited Edition version of Disgaea D2 came bundled with - among others - a figurine of Etna. A series of cell phone straps were released that featured Etna among others. A figurine was produced by Nendoroid, which featured interchangeable heads.

Anime
Etna also appears in the Disgaea anime, when she is Laharl's subordinate that seems to serve him faithfully but has her own secret agenda. She also appears in the manga's novel and manga adaptations.

Reception
Since her appearance in Disgaea: Hour of Darkness, Etna has received generally positive reception and has become a fan-favourite. UGO Networks' K. Thor Jensen included Etna in his list of the 25 best Japanese role-playing game characters. He cited her "sassy attitude and penchant for ultra-violence" for why he included her. Kotaku's Mike Fahey got a tattoo of Etna on his forearm as a result of his fandom for her. Hardcore Gamer's Lee Cooper called the original Disgaea: Hour of Darkness cast one of the "most likable casts of characters in SRPG history" and cited Etna (along with Laharl and Flonne) in particular. GamesRadar featured her in their list of the "top 20 overlooked game babes." They explained that this was due to her physical appearance, which resembles a sexualized 10-year-old girl. VideoGamer's Jamin Smith felt that she added a "badass" element to Disgaea 2: Cursed Memories "often overly sentimental plot." IGN's Vince Ingenito found Etna's anime sequences in Disgaea D2: A Brighter Darkness to be a major highlight of the game, and overall felt that the use of her in addition to Flonne and Laharl to be a positive element of the game. Game Informers Kimberley Wallace agreed that Etna's sequences were a highlight, but felt that Etna and the others lacked intrigue compared to their original incarnations. According to RPGamer, the change in voice actor created a controversy "over which Etna was more true to character." Eurogamer's Simon Parkin felt that Etna's new voice actress would "irritate as many people as it pleases." GameZone praised the voice acting and claimed that Etna was "as devious as ever." GameSpot's Lark Anderson felt that the voice actor change was a "minor squibble."

References

Demon characters in video games
Disgaea characters
Fantasy video game characters
Female characters in anime and manga
Female characters in video games
Fictional henchmen in video games
Role-playing video game characters
Video game bosses
Video game characters introduced in 2003
Video game characters who use magic
Video game characters with superhuman strength
Video game protagonists
Video game sidekicks